Helgolandichthys is an extinct genus of prehistoric bony fish that lived during the Aptian stage of the Early Cretaceous epoch.

See also

 Prehistoric fish
 List of prehistoric bony fish

References

Early Cretaceous fish
Salmoniformes